Sunspot Records was a small independent record label in Arlington, Virginia that existed in the early nineties. The Sunspot roster included bands primarily from the east coast of the U.S. Several of these bands such as Avail, Shades Apart, 1.6 Band, and Fly (pre Trans-Am) went on to have successful music careers. The label was founded, owned, and operated by Bryan Wassom until it closed in 1994.

Discography
 Sunspot 1: Ordeal 7" EP (500 pressed)
 Sunspot 2: Avail 7" EP Who's to Say...What Stays the Same (1000 pressed/3 colors vinyl/3 covers)
 Sunspot 3: Shades Apart 12" EP  Dude Danger (1000 pressed) and re-pressed by the band
 Sunspot 4: Fly 7" EP (1000 pressed) 
 Sunspot 5: 1.6 Band 7" EP Your Restaurant (1000 pressed) and re-pressed on Gern Blandsten Records
 Sunspot 6: Fine Day 7" (1000 pressed)
 Sunspot 7: Groove 7" (1000 pressed)

American independent record labels